AMMDes (short for Alat Mekanis Multiguna Pedesaan—lit. Rural Multipurpose Mechanical Tool) is an agricultural vehicle produced by PT Kreasi Mandiri Wintor Indonesia (KMWI). This vehicle is categorized as rural car. The local content of AMMDes reaches 73%. The price of the base model is Rp70 million (4900 USD in June 2020), not including the equipment it carries. The cheapest equipment price is the irrigation pump (Rp4 million) and the most expensive is the water purifier (Rp40–120 million, depending on the water quality and capacity). From the certification carried out by the Ministry of Industry and PT Surveyor Indonesia, it is known that AMMDes has a TKDN (Tingkat Komponen Dalam Negeri — Domestic Component Level) of 40.92%.

First generation 
The Indonesian Ministry of Industry has the Rural Car Program, collaborated with PT KMWI to make AMMDes prototype. The AMMDes platform originating from a vehicle for oil palm plantations, known as Wintor. In 2018, they collaborated and succeeded in developing AMMDes, by 2019 the mass production stage would begin. AMMDes itself was first launched through the 2018 GIIAS (Gaikindo Indonesia International Auto Show) event. This vehicle carries a 650 cc 1 cylinder diesel engine, which is capable of producing power of 14 hp. In 2019 KMWI has a production capacity of 3,000 units per year. It is planned that the capability will be increased to 12,000 units per year in 2020. After the cancellation of Klaten production plant, AMMDes is currently produced at a rate of 3,000 unit per year.

AMMDes is equipped with PTO (Power Take-Off) to transmit power from the car to other machines. The basic version is a pickup car, can be equipped with a 3-door tub. The rear tire is equipped with an anti-slip system (differential lock system) to facilitate driving through muddy areas. AMMDes carrying capacity is 700 kg. The engine is made in India, the 650 cc 1-cylinder G650 W 1 diesel engine with 14 hp/3000 rpm power and 35 Nm/1800-2200rpm torque, while the gearbox is made in Taiwan, manual 3 forward speed and 1 reverse speed. The fuel tank capacity is 15 liters. The AMMDes is a rear wheel drive vehicle, the front suspension is a double wishbone suspension while the rear suspension is a trailing arm type. AMMDes has a ground clearance of 180 mm (7in) and a turning radius of 4m. The maximum speed is 32 km/h, with a maximum gradeability of 18°.

See also 

 Fin Komodo (ATV)
 Kei car
 Panda car

References

External links 

 KMWI official website
 AMMDes in Ministry of Industry website

Pickup trucks
Vehicles introduced in 2018
Rear-wheel-drive vehicles
Trucks